Kristina Milnor is Professor of Classics in the Department of Classics and Ancient Studies at Barnard College, Columbia University. She specialises in Latin literature, Roman history, feminist theory and gender studies.

Education 
Milnor received her PhD from the University of Michigan in 1998. Her doctoral thesis was entitled Suis omnia tuta locis: Women, Place, and Public Life in the Age of Augustus.

Career 
Milnor joined the faculty at Barnard in 1998. Her first book,Gender, Domesticity, and the Age of Augustus: Inventing Private Life, was published by Oxford University Press in 2005. It won the Goodwin Award of Merit from the American Philological Association in 2006. Milnor received a Frederick Burkhardt Fellowship funded by The American Council of Learned Societies at the Institute for Advanced Studies, Princeton University, 2008–9. Her second book, Graffiti and the Literary Landscape of Roman Pompeii, was published by Oxford University Press in 2014. This was credited with 'clarity, measured scholarship and critical rigour' in reviews.

Bibliography 

 Graffiti and the Literary Landscape of Roman Pompeii (Oxford; Oxford University Press, 2014)
 'Women in Roman Society', The Oxford Handbook of Social Relations in the Roman World, ed. by Michael Peachin (Oxford University Press; 2011) 609-22
 'Women, The Oxford Handbook of Roman Studies, ed. by Alessandro Barchiesi and Walter Scheidel (Oxford University Press, 2010) 815-26
 'Literary Literacy in Roman Pompeii: The Case of Vergil's Aeneid', William A. Johnson and Holt N. Parker, Ancient Literacies: The Culture of Reading in Greece and Rome (Oxford: Oxford University Press, 2009)
 The Cambridge Companion to the Roman Historians, ed. by Andrew Feldherr, 'Women in Roman Historiograhy', (Cambridge: Cambridge University Press, 2009)
 Gender, Domesticity, and the Age of Augustus: Inventing Private Life (Oxford: Oxford University Press, 2008)
 'Livy, Augustus, and the Landscape of the Law', Arethusa 40.1 (2007) 7-23

External references

External links 

 SCS Paper Abstract: https://classicalstudies.org/annual-meeting/150/abstract/lgbtq-parenting-and-profession
 Google Scholar Profile: https://scholar.google.com/citations?user=DOoZdUIAAAAJ&hl=en
 Staff Profile Page: https://barnard.edu/profiles/kristina-milnor

Living people
American women historians
American women academics
Historians of antiquity
Historians of the Mediterranean
Year of birth missing (living people)